Walawela is a village in Sri Lanka. It is located within Central Province with postal code of 21048.

See also
List of towns in Central Province, Sri Lanka

External links

Populated places in Matale District